Sándor Tóth (18 August 1939 – 11 September 2019) was a Hungarian poet and journalist, who edited Vigilia and Magyar Katolikus Rádió. He was a member of the Christian Democratic People's Party (KDNP). He was a Member of Parliament (MP) for Pásztó (Nógrád County Constituency II) between 1990 and 1994. In this capacity he worked in the Committee on Culture, Science, Higher Education, Television, Radio and the Press. He also served as one of the recorders of the National Assembly.

For his literal works, he was awarded the Attila József Prize in 1995. He lectured at the Vitéz János Faculty of Teaching of the Pázmány Péter Catholic University.

Works
 Belül ragyoghatsz (poems, 1992)
 Kövek és pillangók (poems, 1994)
 Arckép és vallomás (prose and lyrical selection, 1994)
 A keresztnevek eredete (1998)
 Kupola-jegyzetek (1998)
 Adagio (poems, 1999)
 Isten ritmusa (essays, 2001)
 Csillagárnyék (poems, 2008)
 Följegyzések a hegyen (publications, articles, 2014)
 Táj és lélek. Barangolások könyve. A Magyar Katolikus Rádió hangfelvételei alapján, 2004-2015; Üveghegy, Százhalombatta, 2015 + DVD
 Fény- és lombhullámok. Kisprózák, arcok, művek; Szt. István Társulat, Bp., 2016

References

1939 births
2019 deaths
Hungarian male poets
Hungarian journalists
Christian Democratic People's Party (Hungary) politicians
Members of the National Assembly of Hungary (1990–1994)
Academic staff of Pázmány Péter Catholic University
People from Szolnok
21st-century Hungarian poets
20th-century Hungarian poets
20th-century journalists
20th-century Hungarian male writers
Male journalists
Attila József Prize recipients